The Department of the Treasury (USDT) is the national treasury and finance department of the federal government of the United States, where it serves as an executive department. The department oversees the Bureau of Engraving and Printing and the U.S. Mint. These two agencies are responsible for printing all paper currency and coins, while the treasury executes its circulation in the domestic fiscal system. The USDT collects all federal taxes through the Internal Revenue Service; manages U.S. government debt instruments; licenses and supervises banks and thrift institutions; and advises the legislative and executive branches on matters of fiscal policy. The department is administered by the secretary of the treasury, who is a member of the Cabinet. The treasurer of the United States has limited statutory duties, but advises the Secretary on various matters such as coinage and currency production. Signatures of both officials appear on all Federal Reserve notes.

The department was established by an Act of Congress in 1789 to manage government revenue. The first secretary of the treasury was Alexander Hamilton, who was sworn into office on September 11, 1789. Hamilton was appointed by President George Washington on the recommendation of Robert Morris, Washington's first choice for the position, who had declined the appointment. Hamilton established the nation's early financial system and for several years was a major presence in Washington's administration. The department is customarily referred to as "Treasury", solely, without any preceding article, as a remnant of the country's transition from British to American English during the late 18th century. Hamilton's portrait appears on the obverse of the ten-dollar bill, while the Treasury Department building is depicted on the reverse.

History

Revolutionary period 
The history of the Department of the Treasury began in the turmoil of the American Revolution, when the Continental Congress at Philadelphia deliberated the crucial issue of financing a war of independence against Great Britain. The Congress had no power to levy and collect taxes, nor was there a tangible basis for securing funds from foreign investors or governments. The delegates resolved to issue paper money in the form of bills of credit, promising redemption in coin on faith in the revolutionary cause. On June 22, 1775—only a few days after the Battle of Bunker Hill—Congress issued $2 million in bills; on July 25, 28 citizens of Philadelphia were employed by Congress to sign and number the currency.

On July 29, 1775, the Second Continental Congress assigned the responsibility for the administration of the revolutionary government's finances to joint Continental treasurers George Clymer and Michael Hillegas. Congress stipulated that each of the colonies contribute to the Continental government's funds. To ensure proper and efficient handling of the growing national debt in the face of weak economic and political ties between the colonies, the Congress, on February 17, 1776, designated a committee of five to superintend the treasury, settle accounts, and report periodically to the Congress. On April 1, a Treasury Office of Accounts, consisting of an auditor general and clerks, was established to facilitate the settlement of claims and to keep the public accounts for the government of the United Colonies. With the signing of the Declaration of Independence on July 4, 1776, the newborn republic as a sovereign nation was able to secure loans from abroad.

Despite the infusion of foreign and domestic loans, the united colonies were unable to establish a well-organized agency for financial administration. Michael Hillegas was first called Treasurer of the United States on May 14, 1777. The Treasury Office was reorganized three times between 1778 and 1781. The $241.5 million in paper Continental bills devalued rapidly. By May 1781, the dollar collapsed at a rate of from 500 to 1000 to 1 against hard currency. Protests against the worthless money swept the colonies, giving rise to the expression "not worth a Continental". The office has, since the late 18th century, been customarily referred to as the singular “Treasury”, without any preceding article, as a remnant of the country's transition from British to American English. For example, the department notes its guiding purpose as "Treasury's mission" instead of "the Treasury's mission."

Robert Morris was designated Superintendent of Finance in 1781 and restored stability to the nation's finances. Morris, a wealthy colonial merchant, was nicknamed "the financier" because of his reputation for procuring funds or goods on a moment's notice. His staff included a comptroller, a treasurer, a register, and auditors, who managed the country's finances through 1784, when Morris resigned because of ill health. The treasury board, consisting of three commissioners, continued to oversee the finances of the confederation of former colonies until September 1789.

Creation of the Treasury

The First Congress of the United States was called to convene in New York on March 4, 1789, marking the beginning of government under the Constitution. On September 2, 1789, Congress created a permanent institution for the management of government finances:Be it enacted by the Senate and House of Representatives of the United States of America in Congress assembled, That there shall be a Department of Treasury, in which shall be the following officers, namely: a Secretary of the Treasury, to be deemed head of the department; a Comptroller, an Auditor, a Treasurer, a Register, and an Assistant to the Secretary of the Treasury, which assistant shall be appointed by the said Secretary.Alexander Hamilton took the oath of office as the first secretary of the treasury on September 11, 1789. Hamilton had served as George Washington's aide-de-camp during the Revolution and was of great importance in the ratification of the Constitution. Because of his financial and managerial acumen, Hamilton was a logical choice for solving the problem of the new nation's heavy war debt. Hamilton's first official act was to submit a report to Congress in which he laid the foundation for the nation's financial health.

To the surprise of many legislators, he insisted upon federal assumption and dollar-for-dollar repayment of the country's $75 million debt in order to revitalize the public credit: "[T]he debt of the United States was the price of liberty. The faith of America has been repeatedly pledged for it, and with solemnities that give peculiar force to the obligation." Hamilton foresaw the development of industry and trade in the United States, suggesting that government revenues be based upon customs duties. His sound financial policies also inspired investment in the Bank of the United States, which acted as the government's fiscal agent.

The treasury believes their seal was created by Francis Hopkinson, the treasurer of loans. He submitted bills to Congress in 1780 that authorized the design of department seals, including the seal for the Board of Treasury. While it is it not certain that Hopkinson designed the seal, it is very similar to others he's done.

2003 reorganization

Congress transferred several agencies that had previously been under the aegis of the Treasury Department to other departments as a consequence of the September 11 attacks.  Effective January 24, 2003, the Bureau of Alcohol, Tobacco and Firearms (ATF), which had been a bureau of the department since 1972, was extensively reorganized under the provisions of the Homeland Security Act of 2002. The law enforcement functions of ATF, including the regulation of legitimate traffic in firearms and explosives, were transferred to the Department of Justice as the Bureau of Alcohol, Tobacco, Firearms, and Explosives (BATFE). The regulatory and tax collection functions of ATF related to legitimate traffic in alcohol and tobacco remained with the treasury at its new Alcohol and Tobacco Tax and Trade Bureau (TTB).

Effective March 1, 2003, the Federal Law Enforcement Training Center, the United States Customs Service, and the United States Secret Service were transferred to the newly created Department of Homeland Security ("DHS").

2020 data breach
In 2020, the Treasury suffered a data breach following a cyberattack likely conducted by a nation state adversary, possibly Russia. This was in fact the first detected case of the much wider 2020 United States federal government data breach, which involved at least eight federal departments.

Responsibilities

Basic functions
The basic functions of the Department of the Treasury mainly include:
 Producing all currency and coinage of the U.S.;
 Collecting taxes, duties and money paid to and due to the U.S.;
 Paying all bills of the U.S.;
 Managing the federal finances;
 Managing government accounts and the United States public debt;
 Supervising national banks and thrift institutions;
 Advising on domestic and international financial, monetary, economic, trade and tax policy (fiscal policy being the sum of these);
 Enforcing federal finance and tax laws;
 Investigating and prosecuting tax evaders;
 Publishing statistical reports.

With respect to the estimation of revenues for the executive branch, Treasury serves a purpose parallel to that of the Office of Management and Budget for the estimation of spending for the executive branch, the Joint Committee on Taxation for the estimation of revenues for Congress, and the Congressional Budget Office for the estimation of spending for Congress.

From 1830 until 1901, responsibility for overseeing weights and measures was carried out by the Office of Standard Weights and Measures under the auspices of the Treasury Department. After 1901, responsibility was assigned to the agency that subsequently became known as the National Institute of Standards and Technology.

Organization
The Department of the Treasury is organized into two major components: the departmental offices and the operating bureaus. The departmental offices are primarily responsible for the formulation of policy and management of the department as a whole, while the operating bureaus carry out the specific operations assigned to the department.

Structure

 Secretary of the Treasury
 Deputy Secretary of the Treasury
 Treasurer of the United States
 Bureau of Engraving and Printing
 Bureau of Engraving and Printing Police
 United States Mint
 United States Mint Police
 Under Secretary for Domestic Finance
 Assistant Secretary for Financial Institutions
 Office of Financial Institutions
 Assistant Secretary for Financial Markets
 Office of Financial Markets
 Fiscal Assistant Secretary
 Office of Fiscal Service
 Bureau of the Fiscal Service

 Under Secretary for International Affairs
 Assistant Secretary for International Markets and Development
 Assistant Secretary for International Affairs
 Assistant Secretary of the Treasury for Investment Security
 Office of Environment and Energy
 Under Secretary for Terrorism and Financial Intelligence (Office of Terrorism and Financial Intelligence)
 Assistant Secretary for Terrorist Financing
 Office of Terrorist Financing and Financial Crimes
 Assistant Secretary for Intelligence and Analysis
 Office of Intelligence and Analysis
 Financial Crimes Enforcement Network
 Office of Foreign Assets Control
 Treasury Executive Office for Asset Forfeiture
 Assistant Secretary of the Treasury for Management / Chief Financial Officer / Performance Improvement Officer
 Assistant Secretary for Economic Policy
 Assistant Secretary for Legislative Affairs
 Assistant Secretary for Public Affairs/Director of policy planning
 Assistant Secretary for Tax Policy
 Climate Counselor
 Alcohol and Tobacco Tax and Trade Bureau
 Commissioner of Internal Revenue
 Internal Revenue Service
 Office of the Comptroller of the Currency
 Office of Financial Research
 Office of the General Counsel
 Office of the Inspector General
 Treasury Inspector General for Tax Administration (TIGTA)

Bureaus

Budget and staffing
The Treasury Department has authorized a budget for Fiscal Year 2015 of $22.6 billion. The budget authorization is broken down as follows:

Freedom of Information Act processing performance
In the latest Center for Effective Government analysis of the fifteen federal agencies that receive the most Freedom of Information Act FOIA requests, published in 2015 (using 2012 and 2013 data, the most recent years available), the treasury failed to earn a satisfactory overall grade.

See also 

 Federal Reserve System
 MicroLoan Program
 Title 12 of the Code of Federal Regulations
 Title 17 of the Code of Federal Regulations
 Title 19 of the Code of Federal Regulations
 Title 31 of the Code of Federal Regulations
 Treasury Enterprise Architecture Framework
 Treasury Information System Architecture Framework

Notes and references

External links

 
 Department of the Treasury on USAspending.gov
 Department of the Treasury in the Federal Register
 Map of Major Foreign Holders Of Treasury Securities 2009
 Annual Reports of the Secretary of the Treasury on the State of Finances – These annual reports also contain the reports of the many departments of the Treasury, including the Bureau of the Mint, Bureau of Engraving and Printing, Bureau of Customs, Office of the Comptroller of the Currency, Secret Service, and the Internal Revenue Service.
 
 Act to establish the Treasury Department. 1st Congress, 1st Session, Ch. 12, 1 Stat. 65

 
Treasury
1789 establishments in the United States
Ministries established in 1789
Finance ministries
Financial regulatory authorities of the United States
Robert Mills buildings